IPC Shopping Centre (formerly Ikano Power Centre) is a shopping centre anchored by IKEA near The Curve in Mutiara Damansara, Selangor, Malaysia. It opened in December 2003 and has 5 floors. It was known as the Ikano Power Centre back then. After extensive renovations done, it opened in November 2017 as IPC Shopping Centre.

Renovation 

From March 2017, IPC Shopping Centre was conducted its first major renovation in time for the mall's 15th Anniversary. The renovation involves the entire shopping centre including the facade to be refurbished, parking spaces remain unchanged and the mall remain open as usual. During the renovation period, most of the tenants (except IKEA and Harvey Norman) in the Shopping Centre were briefly relocated or moved out. The renovation was completed on 29 January 2018.

Access

Public transportation
 Mutiara Damansara MRT station

Car
  LDP from downtown Petaling Jaya, Subang Jaya, Puchong or Kepong
  Sprint Penchala Link from Segambut and downtown Kuala Lumpur

See also 
 Mutiara Damansara

References

External links 
 

2003 establishments in Malaysia
Shopping malls established in 2003
Shopping malls in Selangor